Ka with hook (Ӄ ӄ; italics: Ӄ ӄ) is a letter of the Cyrillic script. It is formed from the Cyrillic letter Ka (К к) by the addition of a hook.

Ka with hook is widely used in the alphabets of Siberia and the Russian Far East: Chukchi, Koryak, Alyutor, Itelmen, Yukaghir, Yupik, Aleut, Nivkh, Ket, Tofalar and Selkup languages, where it represents the voiceless uvular plosive . It was also used in the old Abkhaz and the Ossetian alphabets.

Computing codes

See also
Other Cyrillic letters used to write the sound :
Ҡ ҡ : Cyrillic letter Bashkir Qa
Ԟ ԟ : Cyrillic letter Aleut Ka
Ԛ ԛ : Cyrillic letter Qa
Cyrillic characters in Unicode

Cyrillic letters with diacritics
Letters with hook